The Antarctic ( or , American English also  or ; commonly ) is a polar region around Earth's South Pole, opposite the Arctic region around the North Pole. The Antarctic comprises the continent of Antarctica, the Kerguelen Plateau and other island territories located on the Antarctic Plate or south of the Antarctic Convergence. The region covers some 20 percent of the Southern Hemisphere, of which 5.5 percent (14 million km2) is the surface area of the Antarctica continent itself. All of the land and ice shelves south of 60°S latitude are administered under the Antarctic Treaty System. Biogeographically, the Antarctic realm is one of eight biogeographic realms of Earth's land surface.

Geography 

As defined by the Antarctic Treaty System, the Antarctic region is everything south of the 60°S latitude. The Treaty area covers Antarctica and the archipelagos of the Balleny Islands, Peter I Island, Scott Island, the South Orkney Islands, and the South Shetland Islands. However, this area does not include the Antarctic Convergence, a transition zone where the cold waters of the Southern Ocean collide with the warmer waters of the north, forming a natural border to the region. Because the Convergence changes seasonally, the Convention for the Conservation of Antarctic Marine Living Resources approximates the Convergence line by joining specified points along parallels of latitude and meridians of longitude. The implementation of the convention is managed through an international commission headquartered in Hobart, Australia, by an efficient system of annual fishing quotas, licenses and international inspectors on the fishing vessels, as well as satellite surveillance

The islands situated between 60°S latitude parallel to the south and the Antarctic Convergence to the north, and their respective  exclusive economic zones fall under the national jurisdiction of the countries that possess them: South Georgia and the South Sandwich Islands (United Kingdom), Bouvet Island (Norway), and Heard and McDonald Islands (Australia).

Kerguelen Islands (France; also an EU Overseas territory) are situated in the Antarctic Convergence area, while the Isla Grande de Tierra del Fuego, Falkland Islands, Isla de los Estados, Hornos Island with Cape Horn, Diego Ramírez Islands, Campbell Island, Macquarie Island, Amsterdam and Saint Paul Islands, Crozet Islands, Prince Edward Islands, and Gough Island and Tristan da Cunha group remain north of the Convergence and thus outside the Antarctic region.

Ecology

Antarctica 
A variety of animals live in Antarctica for at least some of the year, including:

 Seals
 Penguins
 South Georgia pipits
 Albatrosses
 Antarctic petrels
 Whales
 Fish, such as Antarctic icefish, Antarctic toothfish
 Squid, including the colossal squid
 Antarctic krill

Most of the Antarctica continent is permanently covered by ice and snow, leaving less than 1 percent of the land exposed. There are only two species of flowering plant, Antarctic hair grass and Antarctic pearlwort, but a range of mosses, liverworts, lichens and macrofungi.

Sub-Antarctic Islands 
Biodiversity among terrestrial flora and fauna is low on the islands: studies have theorized that the harsh climate was a major contributor towards species richness, but multiple correlations have been found with area, temperature, remoteness of islands, and food chain stability. For example, herbivorous insects are poor in number due to low plant richness, and likewise, indigenous bird numbers are related to insects, which are a major food source.

  Isla de los Estados (Argentina)
  Isla Grande de Tierra del Fuego (Chile)

Conservation 

The Antarctic hosts the world's largest protected area comprising 1.07 million km2, the South Georgia and the South Sandwich Islands Marine Protection Area created in 2012. The latter exceeds the surface area of another vast protected territory, the Greenland National Park’s . (While the Ross Sea Marine Protection Area established in 2016 is still larger at 1.55 million km2, its protection is set to expire in 35 years.) To protect the area, all Antarctic ships over 500 tonnes are subject to mandatory regulations under the Polar Code, adopted by the International Maritime Organization (in force since 1 January 2017).

Society

People 
The first recorded sighting of Antarctica is credited to the Spaniard Gabriel de Castilla, who reported seeing distant southern snow-capped mountains in 1603. The first Antarctic land discovered was the island of South Georgia, visited by the English merchant Anthony de la Roché in 1675. Although myths and speculation about a Terra Australis ("Southern Land") date back to antiquity, the first confirmed sighting of the continent of Antarctica is commonly accepted to have occurred in 1820 by the Russian expedition of Fabian Gottlieb von Bellingshausen and Mikhail Lazarev on Vostok and Mirny.

The Australian James Kerguelen Robinson (1859–1914) was the first human born in the Antarctic, on board the sealing ship Offley in the Gulf of Morbihan (Royal Sound then), Kerguelen Island on 11 March 1859. The first human born on an Antarctic island was Solveig Gunbjørg Jacobsen born on 8 October 1913 in Grytviken, South Georgia.

Emilio Marcos Palma (born 7 January 1978) is an Argentine man who was the first documented person born on the continent of Antarctica at the Esperanza Base. His father, Captain Jorge Palma, was head of the Argentine Army detachment at the base. While ten people have been born in Antarctica since, Palma's birthplace remains the southernmost. In late 1977, Silvia Morella de Palma, who was then seven months pregnant, was airlifted to Esperanza Base, in order to complete her pregnancy in the base. The airlift was a part of the Argentine solutions to the sovereignty dispute over territory in Antarctica. Emilio was automatically granted Argentine citizenship by the government since his parents were both Argentine citizens, and he was born in the claimed Argentine Antarctica. Palma can be considered to be the first native Antarctican.

The Antarctic region had no indigenous population when first discovered, and its present inhabitants comprise a few thousand transient scientific and other personnel working on tours of duty at the several dozen research stations maintained by various countries.  However, the region is visited by more than 40,000 tourists annually, the most popular destinations being the Antarctic Peninsula area (especially the South Shetland Islands) and South Georgia Island.

In December 2009, the growth of tourism, with consequences for both the ecology and the safety of the travellers in its great and remote wilderness, was noted at a conference in New Zealand by experts from signatories to the Antarctic Treaty. The definitive results of the conference were presented at the Antarctic Treaty states' meeting in Uruguay in May 2010.

Time zones 

Because Antarctica surrounds the South Pole, it is theoretically located in all time zones. For practical purposes, time zones are usually based on territorial claims or the time zone of a station's owner country or supply base.

List of offshore islands

North of 60°S latitude

South of 60°S latitude

See also 
 Antarctic Circle
 Antarctic ice sheet
 History of Antarctica

Notes

References

Further reading 
 Krupnik, Igor, Michael A. Lang, and Scott E. Miller, eds. Smithsonian at the Poles: Contributions to International Polar Year Science. Washington, D.C.: Smithsonian Institution Scholarly Press, 2009.

External links 
 British Services Antarctic Expedition 2012
 Committee for Environmental Protection of Antarctica
 Secretariat of the Antarctic Treaty
 CCAMLR Commission
 Antarctic Heritage Trusts
 International Association of Antarctica Tour Operators
 Map of the Antarctic Convergence
 The South Atlantic and Subantarctic Islands
 Ushuaia is the most popular gateway to Antarctica

 
Geography of Antarctica